Christos Panagioulas (Domokos, 1882 – ?) was Greek politician.

Biography 
He was born in Domokos, and was the son of Athanasios Panagioulas. He studied law in the University of Athens.

He was elected member of parliament with People's Party in the 1933 election and was reelected, as member of parliament of Phthiotis-Phocis with PP in the 1946 election, and, as member of parliament of Domokos, with Greek Rally, in the 1952 election.

References 

People from Domokos
1882 births
Year of death missing
Greek MPs 1933–1935
Greek MPs 1946–1950
Greek MPs 1952–1956